Good and Bad at Games is a UK television drama, first shown in the Film on Four strand on Channel 4 Television on 8 December 1983. The screenplay was written by William Boyd and the lead roles of Cox, Mount and Niles were played by Anton Lesser, Dominic Jephcott and Martyn Stanbridge. A young Rupert Graves also appears briefly as Guthrie. The film was directed by Jack Gold, and produced by Victor Glynn.

The story, told partly in flashback to 1968, concerns a clique of English public schoolboys who bully and humiliate an unpopular younger pupil (Cox) who is 'bad at games'. Ten years later Cox uses the naive and equal outsider Niles, who is only included in the clique because he is 'good at games', to find out more about the lead persecutor (Mount), in order to exact revenge.

Cast
 Niles – Martyn Stanbridge
 Cox – Anton Lesser
 Mount – Dominic Jephcott
 Frances – Laura Davenport
 Joyce – Frederick Alexander
 Harrop – Graham Seed
 Colenso – Ewan Stewart
 Guthrie – Rupert Graves
 Tregear – Philip Goodhew
 Girl – Ceri Jackson
 Boy – Tristram Wymark

Music
 The songs "Badge" and "Strange Brew" by the rock group Cream are featured prominently.

External links

Channel 4 original programming
1983 television films
1983 films
British television films
Films directed by Jack Gold
Films with screenplays by William Boyd (writer)